= Constituency RSM-164 =

Reserved constituency of the Provincial Assembly of Sindh, Pakistan

RSM-164
- Provincial Reserved constituency for the Provincial Assembly of Sindh

Current constituency

RSM-164 is a reserved Constituency of the Provincial Assembly of Sindh.

== See also ==
- Sindh
